Sir Nathaniel William Hamish Macleod  was a Scottish civil servant in Hong Kong. MacLeod was the last Financial Secretary of Hong Kong with British descent.

Early life 
In 1940, Macleod was born in Midlothian, Scotland.

Career 
Macleod was Financial Secretary of Hong Kong from 1991 to 1995. Macleod also was the Secretary for Trade and Industry of Hong Kong from 1987 to 1989 and the Secretary for the Treasury of Hong Kong from 1989 to 1991.

In 1991, Macleod was appointed as Financial Secretary of Hong Kong. Macleod succeeded Piers Jacobs. In August 1995, at age 55, MacLeod retired as Financial Secretary of Hong Kong.

In 2003 Macleod was director and Chairman of JPMorgan Asian Investment Trust PLC.

Personal life 
In 1997, Macleod returned to the United Kingdom after the Hong Kong handover.

References

1940 births
Government officials of Hong Kong
Living people
Financial Secretaries of Hong Kong
Knights Commander of the Order of the British Empire
HK LegCo Members 1988–1991
HK LegCo Members 1991–1995
People from British Hong Kong